Akat is a subdistrict (tambon) in  Akat Amnuai District, Sakon Nakhon Province, Isan region, Thailand.

Populated places in Sakon Nakhon province
Tambon of Sakon Nakhon Province